The 2021 Pepperdine Waves men's volleyball team represented Pepperdine University in the 2021 NCAA Division I & II men's volleyball season. The Waves, led by fourth year head coach David Junt, play their home games at Firestone Fieldhouse. The Waves are members of the MPSF and were picked to finish second in the preseason poll.

Season highlights
Will be filled in as the season progresses.

Roster

Schedule
TV/Internet Streaming information:
All home games will be televised on WaveCasts. All road games will also be streamed by the schools tv or streaming service. The conference tournament will be streamed by FloVolleyball. The NCAA Tournament will be streamed on B1G+ (opening round, quarterfinals), NCAA.com (semifinals), and the Championship will be televised nationally on ESPNU.

 *-Indicates conference match.
 Times listed are Pacific Time Zone.

Announcers for televised games
Concordia: Al Epstein
Concordia: Viola Patience O'Neal
BYU: Jarom Jordan & Steve Vail
BYU: Jarom Jordan & Steve Vail
Stanford: Tim Swartz
Stanford: Tim Swartz
USC: Mark Beltran & Paul Duchesne
USC: Al Epstein
Stanford: Al Epstein
UCLA: Denny Cline
UCLA: Al Epstein
BYU: Al Epstein
BYU: Al Epstein
Grand Canyon: Al Epstein
Grand Canyon: Al Epstein
Grand Canyon: Al Epstein
Stanford: Jarom Jordan & Steve Vail
UCLA: Jarom Jordan & Steve Vail
BYU: Jarom Jordan & Steve Vail
UC Santa Barbara: Luke Wood Maloney & Ben Spurlock

References

2021 in sports in California
2021 NCAA Division I & II men's volleyball season
2021 Mountain Pacific Sports Federation volleyball season